Statistics of Swiss Super League in the 1919–20 season.

East

Table

Results

Central

Table

Results

West

Table

Results

Final

Table

Results 

|colspan="3" style="background-color:#D0D0D0" align=center|9 May 1920

|-
|colspan="3" style="background-color:#D0D0D0" align=center|13 May 1920

|-
|colspan="3" style="background-color:#D0D0D0" align=center|23 May 1920

Young Boys Bern won the championship.

Sources 
 Switzerland 1919-20 at RSSSF

References 

Seasons in Swiss football
Swiss Football League seasons 
1919–20 in Swiss football
Swiss